The Escuela Nacional de Cine (ENC) (National Film School)  is a private educational institution located in Venezuela Caracas Metropolitan District. Founded at the initiative of Bolívar Films as house specializing in cinema studies March 1, 2009.

External links 
 http://www.escuelanacionaldecine.com.ve/ 
 http://www.bolivarfilms.com/

Private schools in Venezuela
2009 establishments in Venezuela